Eastern Pomerania can refer to distinct parts of Pomerania:

The historical region of Farther Pomerania, which was the eastern part of the Duchy, later Province of Pomerania
The historical region of Pomerelia including Gdańsk Pomerania, located east of Farther Pomerania

Terminology 
The term "West Pomerania" is ambiguous, since it may refer to either Hither Pomerania (in German usage and historical usage based on German terminology), to both Hither and Farther Pomerania combined, or to the West Pomeranian Voivodeship (in Polish usage).

The term "East Pomerania" may similarly carry different meanings, referring either to Farther Pomerania (in German usage and historical usage based on German terminology), to Pomerelia, or to the Pomeranian Voivodeship (in Polish usage).

See also
 Western Pomerania (disambiguation)

References

Pomerania